The Intelligent Design and Evolution Awareness Center (IDEA Center) is a nonprofit advocacy organization that promotes the pseudoscientific principle of intelligent design.

The center was formed in 2001; it grew out of a Christian student club that was formed at University of California, San Diego in May 1999 by Steve Renner, Eddie Colanter, and Casey Luskin after the "father" of the intelligent design movement Phillip E. Johnson lectured at UCSD.  By 2008 it appeared to be moribund.

See also

 A Scientific Support for Darwinism
 Creation–evolution controversy
 National Center for Science Education
 Project Steve

References

External links
 IDEA Center site
 Human Timeline (Interactive) – Smithsonian, National Museum of Natural History (August 2016).

Intelligent design organizations
Non-profit organizations based in the United States
1999 establishments in California
Christian organizations established in the 20th century